Kentucky Route 547 is a  state highway that runs from KY-10 in Alexandria to KY-8 in Silver Grove. The entire route is in Campbell County.

Major intersections

References

0547
0547